Hajjiabad (also Romanized as Ḩājjīābād, Ḩajīābād, and Ḩājīābād) is a village in Beyza Rural District, Beyza District, Sepidan County, Fars Province, Iran. At the 2006 census, its population was 476, in 114 families.

References 

Populated places in Beyza County